The Journal of Educational Research is a bimonthly peer-reviewed academic journal covering research into education.  It was established in 1920 and is published by Taylor & Francis. The editor-in-chief is Mary F. Heller (University of Hawaii–West Oahu).  According to the Journal Citation Reports, the journal has a 2016 impact factor of 1.197.

References

External links

Education journals
Publications established in 1920
Bimonthly journals
Taylor & Francis academic journals
English-language journals